Flyscooters, formerly known under the name Znen, was an American company that marketed gas-powered motor scooters manufactured in China and Taiwan. The company was founded in 2006 in Florida by scooter enthusiasts Leon Li and Daniel Pak, and ceased operations in 2010. During the operating life of the company, Flyscooters' basic business model was to import low-cost scooters from abroad (mostly the Chinese firm Zhongneng Industry Group (Znen)) and distribute them under the Fly brand name to a network of retail scooter dealerships across the United States, providing dealers with warranty and spare parts support.

Flyscooters' main marketing focus was the Internet, although the company attended industry events and trade shows and promoted their brand through other PR initiatives .

Models

Scooters 
 El Capitan 250
 X808 150
 Seba 150
 Swift 150
 Cadenza 150 cc
 Il Bello 50  & 150 cc
 La Vie 150 cc
 Swift 50 cc
 Rio 50cc & 150cc
 Trek 50cc & 150cc
 Pico 50cc
 E-250 250cc
 Fly Scout 110cc

Il Bello

The Il Bello is a street legal, gas-powered motor scooter assembled in China using parts sourced from China,. Il Bello is an unlicensed copy of the Honda Joker and is the flagship vehicle of Flyscooters. The Il Bello has 4-stroke air-cooled motor and gets 70-90 mpg. It is certified by the California Air Resources Board (CARB) and the United States Department of Transportation (DOT). It comes in 50cc and 150cc. Sometimes the Il Bello is erroneously called Il Bella. The Il Bello is assembled in China at Taizhou Zhongneng Motorcycle Co. Ltd, also known in the industry as ZNEN. The Il Bello is available from brick and mortar dealers.

50 cc specification:
 Engine: Single Cylinder, 4-stroke
 Displacement: 50cc
 Fuel Consumption: 88 mpg
 Top Speed: 37 mph
 Cooling System: Forced Air
 Compression Ratio: 10.5 to 1
 Maximum Power: 2.7 hp @ 8000 rpm
 Maximum Torque 1.6 ft lb @ 6000 rpm
 Fuel System: carbureted
 Drive System: CVT (fully automated)
 Load Capacity: 230 lbs
 Starting System: electric and kick start
 Front tire: 3.5 – 10 inch
 Rear tire: 3.5 – 10 inch
 Front Suspension: dual telescopic
 Rear Suspension: single non-adjustable shock
 Front brake: performance disc
 Rear brake: drum
 Dry Weight: 213 lbs
 Wheelbase: 47.8 inches
 Ground Clearance: 3.9 inches
 Seat Height: 27.2 inches
 Overall Length: 74.1 inches
 Fuel Capacity: 1.43 gallon
 Battery: 12 volt
 Transmission Belts: Gates, United States
 Spark Plugs: NGK, Japan
 Bearings: NSK, Japan
 Piston Rings: ATG, Taiwan
 Gasoline: 91 octane
 Tires: Chengshin, Taiwan or Duro Huafeng, Taiwan
 Battery: YUASA
 Headlight: Philips
 Carburetor: Deni (joint venture of KEIHIN, Japan) used in Harley Davidson, Honda and other major brands of motorcycles.

150 cc specifications:
 Engine: Single Cylinder, 4-stroke
 Displacement: 150cc
 Fuel Consumption: 79mpg
 Top Speed: 50 mph
 Cooling System: Forced Air
 Compression Ratio: 9.2 to 1
 Maximum Power: 8.4 hp @ 7000 rpm
 Maximum Torque 5.0 ft lb @ 6000 rpm
 Fuel System: Carbureted
 Drive System: CVT (fully automated)
 Load Capacity: 310 lbs
 Starting System: electric and kick start
 Front tire: 3.5 – 10 inch
 Rear tire: 3.5 – 10 inch
 Front Suspension: dual telescopic
 Rear Suspension: single non-adjustable shock
 Front brake: performance disc
 Rear brake: drum
 Dry Weight: 223 lbs
 Wheelbase: 47.8 inches
 Ground Clearance: 3.9 inches
 Seat Height: 27.2 inches
 Overall Length: 74.1 inches
 Fuel Capacity: 1.3 gallon
 Battery: 12 volt
 Transmission Belts: Gates, United States
 Spark Plugs: NGK, Japan
 Bearings: NSK, Japan
 Piston Rings: ATG, Taiwan
 Gasoline: 91 octane
 Tires: Chengshin, Taiwan or Duro Huafeng, Taiwan
 Battery: YUASA
 Headlight: Philips
 Carburetor: Deni (joint venture of KEIHIN, Japan) used in Harley Davidson, Honda and other major brands of motorcycles.

La Vie
La Vie is a street legal, gas-powered motor scooter assembled in China using parts sourced from China, Japan, Taiwan, and the United States. The La Vie has 4-stroke air-cooled motor and gets 95-100 mpg. It is certified by the California Air Resources Board (CARB) and the United States Department of Transportation (DOT).

La Vie is assembled in China and only available from brick and mortar dealers; it cannot be purchased online or drop shipped. The strict maintenance and care from dealers mandated by Flyscooters is argued as restricting because alterations to the La Vie may void warranty.

La Vie comes in Sea Mist Green, Montego Red, Royal Purple and Cinnamon Brown. It is no longer available in Peruvian Gold. La Vie has locking under seat storage, pop-out passenger foot pegs, both a side and center stand, and a locking forward compartment. It is made from scratch and dig resistant ABS material rather than fiberglass or metal. Deploying the side stand does not kill the engine which is the norm, and starting the motor cannot be accomplished until applying one of the brakes.

The demographic breakdown of La Vie riders is roughly half riders trying to go green and be eco-friendly while the other half is made up of senior citizens.

La Vie riders are active on forums, participate in community rallies, and form clubs dedicated to Flyscooters, like Scooter Squadron.  Flyscooters is known for strong dealer support, dedication to customer service and encourages good will and philanthropy that range from teaming with Avon, Massachusetts fire fighters to raise money for a relief fund,  to donations to Marlborough School where the La Vie was photographed with actress Jamie Lee Curtis.

Specifications:
 Engine: Single Cylinder, 4-stroke
 Displacement: 151cc
 Fuel Consumption: 74mpg
 Top Speed: 55 mph
 Cooling System: Forced Air
 Compression Ratio: 9.2 to 1
 Maximum Power: 8.4 hp @ 7000 rpm
 Maximum Torque 5.0 ft lb @ 6000 rpm
 Fuel System: Carbureted
 Drive System: CVT (fully automated)
 Load Capacity: 330 lbs
 Starting System: electric and kick start
 Front tire: Tubeless 120/70-12"
 Rear tire: Tubeless 120/70-12"
 Front Suspension: dual hydraulic shock absorbers
 Rear Suspension: pre-loaded adjustable hydraulic shock absorber
 Front brake: hydraulically operated performance disc
 Rear brake: hydraulically operated performance disc
 Dry Weight: 242 lbs (110 kg)
 Wheelbase: 54.8 inches
 Seat Height: 33.0 inches
 Fuel Capacity: 1.3 gallon
 Battery: 12 volt
 Transmission Belts: Gates, US
 Spark Plugs: NGK, Japan
 Bearings: NSK, Japan
 Piston Rings: ATG, Taiwan
 Gasoline: 91 octane
 Tires: Chengshin, Taiwan or Duro Huafeng, Taiwan
 Battery: YUASA
 Headlight: Philips
 Carburetor: Deni (joint venture of KEIHIN, Japan) used in Harley Davidson, Honda and other major brands of motorcycles.

Accessory 
 Scooter Bug trailer

References

Bibliography
 
  
 Just Gotta Scoot, May 2008
  Rachel Ray Show 
 Discovery Science Channel, Scooter Shooter Episode July 2009
 Patriot Ledger newspaper
 Avon Local paper
 International Scooterists BBS
 ScootDawg Scooter Forum
 Asia Media, Journal of Culture and Commerce, March 7, 2008. Vol. II, Issue V
 Just Gotta Scoot, May 2008

Further reading
 Patriot Ledger newspaper
 Avon Local paper
 International Scooterists BBS
 ScootDawg Scooter Forum
 Just Gotta Scoot Just Gotta Scoot, May 2008
 Rachael Ray Show January 30, 2009
 Hollywood.com March 12, 2009
 Celebrity Sitings March 12, 2009
 DailyCeleb March 12, 2009
 Discovery Science Channel, Scooter Shooter Episode, July 2009

External links 

Official Flyscooters site

 Review by Scootdawg
 Review by Powersports Network

 
Scooter manufacturers
Defunct motorcycle manufacturers of China